Langenprozelten is an outlying centre (Stadtteil) of Gemünden am Main in the Main-Spessart district, in Bavaria, Germany. It lies on the river Main, 40 km northwest of Würzburg.

References

Main-Spessart